Teofil Pożyczka (1912 – c. 1974) was a Polish pilot during World War II. He served as technical officer in the Centralne Warsztaty Lotnicze (Central Aerial Works) in the Polish September Campaign of 1939.

Biography
Pożyczka was a graduate of the second promotion of the Szkoła Podchorążych Lotnictwa (technical group), and was nominated Lieutenant in the corps of aviation officers: engineering group, 1 October 1937, lok. 13.

Born on 27 April 1912 in Radom, he was unmarried before the war, but had a fiancée. He finished primary education in 1924, and Lyceum in 1933 in the mathematical-natural direction. Additionally, he attended the City Industrial School named after Jan Kiliński (Miejska Szkoła Przemysłowa im. Kilińskiego) in Radom in the mechanical direction (1927). He worked as a rifle assembly technician from 1 August 1927 to 1 September 1929 in the public weapon factory in Radom. In 1936 he finished the School of Officer Cadets in Warsaw — engineering group. His last war ranks were a major and a British W/Cdr. He was a pilot and technical officer, and flew in total around 900 hours, in majority on two and multi-motor aircraft.

From 1 April 1944 to 1 February 1945 he was Commander of the No. 300 "Land of Masovia" Bomber Squadron, and from 6 May 1945 to 18 December 1946 he was Commander of the No. 301 Polish Bomber Squadron — 1586 squadron For Special Tasks.

After the war
After the war he remained in Great Britain, where he ran his own shop. He died as a result of disease at age 62 in the Ipswich hospital in Suffolk, and was also buried there.

Awards
Virtuti Militari
Krzyż Walecznych x4
Distinguished Service Order (DSO)
Distinguished Flying Cross (United Kingdom) (DFC)

Shortened course of service
 1 September 1939: CWL Dęblin — Officer of technical oversight ppor. (lieutenant).
 29 October 1939: Salon France
 27 January 1940: Eastchurch in Great Britain — awaiting allocation
 15 May 1940: training as pilot
 11 June 1940: training as pilot
 7 July 1940: No. 301 (P) Bomber Squadron Bramcote — participation in squadron's first combat tasks
 20 June 1942: 18 OTU Bramcote — instructor por. (first lieutenant).
 19 January 1944: No. 300 (P) Bomber Squadron Ingham and later Faldingworth — Commander of Squadron
 2 February 1945: Main headquarters 1 group, Ops room - mjr.
 2 May 1945: No. 301 Bomber Squadron, Commander of Squadron

1912 births
1974 deaths
Polish aviators